was a Prefectural Natural Park in northwest Kagoshima Prefecture, Japan. Established in 1981, the park was within the municipality of Satsumasendai. In 2015, the park was subsumed into Koshikishima Quasi-National Park.

See also
 National Parks of Japan
 Koshikijima Islands

References

Parks and gardens in Kagoshima Prefecture
Protected areas established in 1981
1981 establishments in Japan